Cokesbury is a census-designated place (CDP) in Greenwood County, South Carolina, United States. The population was 215 at the 2010 census, down from 279 in 2000.

History
The name "Cokesbury" is a combination of the names of two prominent bishops of the Methodist Episcopal Church, Thomas Coke and Francis Asbury.

The historic village of Cokesbury and the building that housed the Masonic Female College and Cokesbury Conference School are listed together on the National Register of Historic Places as an historic district.

Geography
Cokesbury is located in northern Greenwood County at  (34.287984, -82.207892).

Demographics

As of the census of 2000, there were 279 people, 105 households, and 78 families residing in the CDP. The population density was 444.1 people per square mile (171.0/km2). There were 111 housing units at an average density of 176.7/sq mi (68.0/km2). The racial makeup of the CDP was 25.09% White, 72.76% African American, 1.08% Native American, and 1.08% from two or more races.

There were 105 households, out of which 33.3% had children under the age of 18 living with them, 52.4% were married couples living together, 17.1% had a female householder with no husband present, and 25.7% were non-families. 25.7% of all households were made up of individuals, and 7.6% had someone living alone who was 65 years of age or older. The average household size was 2.66 and the average family size was 3.14.

In the CDP, the population was spread out, with 26.2% under the age of 18, 6.5% from 18 to 24, 27.2% from 25 to 44, 29.0% from 45 to 64, and 11.1% who were 65 years of age or older. The median age was 40 years. For every 100 females, there were 80.0 males. For every 100 females age 18 and over, there were 89.0 males.

The median income for a household in the CDP was $31,908, and the median income for a family was $31,447. Males had a median income of $16,927 versus $30,625 for females. The per capita income for the CDP was $13,592. About 7.4% of families and 13.5% of the population were below the poverty line, including none of those under the age of eighteen and 51.7% of those 65 or over.

Notable People
William Washington Vance, Louisiana politician born in Cokesbury in 1849
John Gary Evans - 85th Governor of South Carolina

References

Census-designated places in Greenwood County, South Carolina
Census-designated places in South Carolina